Korangi Creek Cantonment or Korangi Cantonment is a cantonment town of the city of Karachi, in Sindh, Pakistan. It serves as a military base and residential establishment. It was established by the British Colonial Army in 19th-century British Raj and by Fort Wrigley. Currently, the former local seat of the British Wrigley-Pimley-McKerr family still stands. It was transferred to Pakistan Army after independence in 1947. The cantonment maintains its own infrastructure of water and electricity and is located outside the jurisdiction of the City District Government of Karachi.

See also
 Army Cantonment Board, Pakistan
 Ibrahim Hyderi
 Faisal Cantonment
 Cantonment
 PAF Base Korangi
 Korangi
 Korangi Town
 Korangi District
 Korangi J Area
 Korangi Industrial Area
 Korangi (disambiguation)
 Korangi railway station

References

Cantonments in Karachi
Coastal cities and towns in Pakistan
Pakistan Army airbases